Decisive Battles of the American Civil War, Vol. 2 is a 1988 computer wargame developed and published by Strategic Studies Group.

Gameplay
Decisive Battles of the American Civil War, Vol. 2 is a game in which five battles from mid-1862 through the end of 1863 are covered.

Reception
Jay C. Selover reviewed the game for Computer Gaming World, and stated that "This game is an excellent simulation of Civil War combat."

Jay C. Selover again reviewed the game for Computer Gaming World, and stated that "If my prior review of this game did not put you off completely; you may just have to go out and buy an IBM machine so that you can, at least, properly enjoy the game."

Reviews
ACE (Advanced Computer Entertainment) - Sep, 1988
Computer Gaming World - Oct, 1990

References

External links

Article in Computer Games Week
Review in Zzap!
Article in Game Players

1988 video games
American Civil War video games
Apple II games
Commodore 64 games
Computer wargames
DOS games
Strategic Studies Group games
Turn-based strategy video games
Video game sequels
Video games developed in Australia
Video games set in Georgia (U.S. state)
Video games set in Pennsylvania
Video games set in Tennessee
Video games set in Virginia